The World Allround Speed Skating Championships for Men took place on 20 and 21 February 1982 in Assen at the De Bonte Wever ice rink.

Title holder was the Norwegian Amund Sjøbrend.

Classification

  * = Fell

Source:

References

World Allround Speed Skating Championships, 1982
1982 World Allround

Attribution
In Dutch